The 1969 East Tennessee State Buccaneers football team was an American football team that East Tennessee State University (ETSU) as a member of the Ohio Valley Conference (OVC) in the 1969 NCAA College Division football season. East Tennessee State completed an undefeated season, going 10–0–1 and capturing the OVC championship. This is the only undefeated season and the last conference championship for the program up until 2018. The team capped off the season by defeating Louisiana Tech and future Pro Football Hall of Fame quarterback Terry Bradshaw in the Grantland Rice Bowl.

Schedule

References

East Tennessee State
East Tennessee State Buccaneers football seasons
Ohio Valley Conference football champion seasons
Grantland Rice Bowl champion seasons
College football undefeated seasons
East Tennessee State Buccaneers football